Jian Shuo (died May 189) was the leader of the eunuch faction in the imperial court during the late Eastern Han dynasty of China. Along with Zhang Rang, Jian Shuo eventually became a leading member of the Ten Attendants, who became the most powerful eunuchs during the time. When Emperor Ling of Han died in May 189, Jian Shuo wanted to enthrone Emperor Ling's younger son, Liu Xie, and kill Empress Dowager He's brother, He Jin (uncle of Emperor Ling's older son Liu Bian). However, the plot was discovered by He Jin and foiled. When Liu Bian ascended to the throne as Emperor Shao, He Jin had Jian Shuo arrested and executed.

See also
 Lists of people of the Three Kingdoms

References

 
 Fan, Ye (5th century). Book of the Later Han (Houhanshu).

Eunuchs during the end of the Han dynasty
2nd-century births
189 deaths
Executed Han dynasty people
People executed by the Han dynasty
Han dynasty generals
2nd-century executions